Khinialon or Chinialon or Chinialus (undetermined origin) was chieftain of the Kutrigurs. In 551 he came from the "western side of the Maeotic Lake" to assist the Gepids at the war with Lombards with 12,000 Kutrigurs. Later along with the Gepids they plundered the Byzantine lands. However, Byzantine emperor Justinian I through diplomatic persuasion and bribery dragged the Kutrigurs and Utigurs into mutual warfare. The Utigurs led by Sandilch attacked the Kutrigurs, who suffered great losses.

See also
 Kutrigurs
 Utigurs

References

Sources
 
 
 

6th-century monarchs in Europe
Kutrigurs